The Meyers Manx dune buggy is a small recreationally-oriented automobile, designed initially for desert racing by Californian engineer, artist, boat builder and surfer Bruce F. Meyers. It was produced by his Fountain Valley, California company, B. F. Meyers & Co. from 1964 to 1971, in the form of car kits applied to shortened chassis of Volkswagen Beetles.   The car line dominated dune racing in its time, breaking records immediately, and was eventually also released in street-oriented models, until the company's demise due to tax problems after Meyers's departure.  New vehicles inspired by the original Manx buggy have been produced by Meyers's re-founded operation, Meyers Manx, Inc., since 2000. The name and cat logo of the brand derives from the Manx cat, by virtue of the tailless breed's and the shortened vehicle's truncated "stubbiness".

Home-made prototype
Drawing on his experience in sailboat construction, Meyers modeled and built his first dune buggy, "Old Red", a shortened VW Beetle with a monocoque, fiberglass shell and Chevrolet pickup truck (trailing arm style) suspension, in late 1963 to May 1964 in his garage in Newport Beach, California. The first known street-legal fiberglass dune buggy, it featured a unibody shell that fused body, fenders and frame, retaining just the engine, transmission and other mechanicals of the VW, and with no top and no hood. The use of compound curves throughout provided great rigidity. The fenders were arched high, to make room for large, knobby dirt-racing wheels.

The "Manx" name for the shortened, taller-wheeled, more maneuverable VW Beetle mods refers to and derives from the comparably stubby Manx cat breed, colloquially called "stubbins"; they are short-spined and stub-tailed-to-tailless, long-legged, and known for their turning ability while chasing. The Meyers Manx logo prominently features a Manx cat. The tailless cat in the logo, as featured on the hood ornament, is stylized after a passant heraldic lion, its right forepaw brandishing a sword. The name also suggests racing fitness, as the already globally renowned, British-manufactured Norton Manx motorcycle dominated the Isle of Man TT, Manx Grand Prix and other Isle of Man-based (i.e. Manx) international races from the 1940s to the early 1970s. The Meyers Manx has no direct connection to the Isle of Man.

Meyers produced kits later in 1964 and into 1965, marketed under the name Meyers Manx.  Although this early design was critically acclaimed, even featured on the April 1967 cover of Car & Driver magazine, and drew much attention, it proved too expensive to be profitable; ultimately only 12 kits of the monocoque Manx were produced. Meyers and a friend (both amateur racers) broke by over four hours the Ensenada – La Paz run's record of 39 hours, until then held by a pro racer. According to James Hale, compiler of the Dune Buggy Handbook, this feat ushered in an era of Meyers Manx "domination in off-road events ... and the formation of NORRA (National Off-Road Racing Association)".

B. F. Meyers & Co.
The commercially manufactured Meyers Manx Mk I featured an open-wheeled fiberglass bodyshell, coupled with the Volkswagen Beetle H4 flat-four engine (1.2 L, 1.3 L, 1.5 L and 1.6 L, in different models) and a modified, RR-layout Beetle frame. It is a small car, with a wheelbase 14 inches (36.2 cm) shorter than a Beetle automobile for lightness and better maneuverability. For this reason, the car is capable of very quick acceleration and good off-road performance, despite not being four-wheel drive. The usually street-legal car redefined and filled a recreational and competitive niche that had been essentially invented by the first civilian Jeep in 1945, and which was later to be overtaken by straddle-ridden, motorcycle-based all-terrain vehicles (introduced in 1970) and newer, small and sporty (but usually four-wheel-drive), off-road automobiles.

The commercial Meyers Manx received widespread recognition when it defeated motorcycles, trucks and other cars to win the inaugural 1967 Mexican 1000 race (the predecessor of the Baja 1000).  It crossed automotive press genre lines, being selected as the cover story in the August 1966 issue of Hot Rod magazine.

Approximately 6,000 of the original Meyers Manx dune buggies were produced, but when the design became popular many copies (estimated at a quarter of a million worldwide) were made by other companies. Although already patented, Meyers & Co. lost in court to the copiers, the judge rescinding his patent as unpatentable, opening the floodgates to the industry Meyers started.  Since then, numerous vehicles of the general "dune buggy" or "beach buggy" body type, some VW-based, others not, have been and continue to be produced.  An early example was the Imp by EMPI (1968–1970), which borrowed stylistic elements from the Chevrolet Corvette but was otherwise Manx-like.  A later 1970s Manx clone was the Dune Runner from Dune Buggy Enterprises in Westminster, California. The Meyers company attempted to stay ahead of this seemingly unfair competition with the release of the distinctive, and harder-to-copy, Meyers Manx Mk II design.

B. F. Meyers & Co. also produced other Beetle-based vehicles, including the May 1970 Car & Driver magazine cover sporty Manx SR  variant (street roadsters, borrowing some design ideas from the Porsche 914), the Meyers Tow'd (sometimes referred to as the "Manx Tow'd", a non-street-legal racing vehicle designed to be towed to the desert or beach), the Meyers Tow'dster (a street-legal hybrid of the two), and Meyers Resorter a.k.a. Meyers Turista (a small recreational or "resort" vehicle inspired by touring motorcycles).  The Manx SR2 was a modified SR that was only produced by later manufacturers including Karma Coachworks, Heartland Motors and Manx Motors of MD. While the Tow'd was a minimal off-road racer and the SR/SR2 was a showy roadster, the Tow'dster was a compromise between a dune-capable vehicle and a more utilitarian street rod, and "paved the way for the rail-type buggy that was to dominate the buggy scene following the demise of the traditional Manx-type buggy."

The company ceased operation in 1971, after financial troubles, including with the Internal Revenue Service; and Bruce Meyers himself had already left his own company by then.

Meyers Manx, Inc.
In 2000, Bruce Meyers created a resurgence of interest by founding Meyers Manx, Inc., based in Valley Center, California, and offering the Classic Manx series, a limited edition of 100.

In 2002, the Manxter 2+2 and Manxter DualSport were born. These two new models are modernizations of the original design, but are sized for a full-length Beetle floor pan (and the DualSport can also be based on a Super Beetle chassis, unlike any other Manx model). Custom versions for higher-power engines and other variations are also available.

In the spring of 2009, Meyers re-introduced the shortened wheelbase. Named the  Manx after the last action a surfer performs before reaching the shore, it is available in two models. The Kick-Out Manx Traditional is an updated version of the original Manx concept, with wider fenders, plus a front-hinged hood providing extra storage and easier access to electricals. The Kick-Out Manx  (a.k.a. Kick-Out S.S. Manx) version is much more modern, with headlights flared into the hood, curved windshield, sculpted rear deck cover and twin roll hoops.

, no Meyers Manx kits are based on the New Beetle or other modern Volkswagen cars, only particular original Beetle and Super Beetle models, which are rear-engine and rear-wheel-drive.  No Meyers Manx kits are based on front-engine, front-wheel-drive platforms.  Aftermarket frames are available, designed to duplicate VW chassis dimensions but provide improvements such as more modern or more rugged components.

Meyers Manx, LLC
On 9 November 2020 it was announced that Bruce and Winnie Meyers had sold their company to Trousdale Ventures. The new company would be called Meyers Manx, LLC.

Bruce Meyers died in California on February 19, 2021, at the age of 94.

See also
Baja Bug
Cal looker
Cal-Style VW
Formula Vee
Volksrod

References

 Meyers Manx FourWheeler.com documentary

External links

MeyersManx.com – the modern manufacturer's official website
 Includes detailed technical specs, timeline, and photos.

Kit cars
Off-road vehicles
Volkswagen Beetle modifications
Motor vehicle manufacturers based in California
Cars powered by boxer engines
Rear-engined vehicles